The women's 50 metre freestyle competition at the 2010 Pan Pacific Swimming Championships took place on August 21 at the William Woollett Jr. Aquatics Center.  The last champion was Kara Lynn Joyce of US.

This race consisted of one length of the pool in freestyle.

Records
Prior to this competition, the existing world and Pan Pacific records were as follows:

Results
All times are in minutes and seconds.

Heats
The first round was held on August 21, at 10:30.

B Final 
The B final was held on August 21, at 18:51.

A Final 
The A final was held on August 21, at 18:51.

References

2010 Pan Pacific Swimming Championships
2010 in women's swimming